Ghassan Sarkis (born in Bikfaya in 1957) is a Lebanese-French basketball coach who has worked in the Lebanese Basketball League. He became especially famous during his time coaching the Lebanese team Sagesse in its golden years of success of the 1990s and 2000s. He has also coached the Lebanon national basketball team.

Biography 
Born in Bikfaya, Matn, on August 8, 1957, he has 3 children: Karl Sarkis, the basketball player, Ralph, and Stephany.

He began his coaching career in 1978, in the midst of the Civil War.

In 1992, he was appointed the coach the Sagesse club, and with them won the Lebanese Championship, and the FIBA Asia Champions Cup in 1999 and 2000.

In 2005, he started training Champville. 

In 2021, he was hospitalized after experiencing complications from COVID-19. On February 24, 2021, it was reported that he had been extubated and was recovering.

Previous teams 
Lebanon
 Sagesse
 Champville
 Homenetmen
 Amchit
 Al-Riyadi
 Kahraba Zouk
 Abnaa Neptun
 Aamal Club in Bikfaya
Syria
 Al-Ittihad SC Aleppo (2004–2005)

See also 

 Fadi Khatib
 Elie Mchantaf
 Lebanese Basketball
Al Riyadi

References 

1957 births
Living people
Lebanese basketball coaches
Sagesse SC basketball coaches
Al Riyadi Club Beirut basketball coaches